Scheppach is a German main manufacturer of cement mixers and building machinery, and also a main manufacturer of woodworking machinery.
Scheppach is designed in Germany and made in Germany and China.

History
The company was founded in 1927 in Niederraunau by Josef Scheppach (1887 - 1974). The company turned over 106 million euros in 2015/16. With the founding of the 100% subsidiary Woodster GmbH, sales activities in the DIY and discount sectors were started and the portfolio was continuously expanded. In 2016 the construction of the new administration building in Ichenhausen began, where new office space will be created on around 1000 m2.

Structure
It is situated in Ichenhausen, in Günzburg, in western Bavaria, close to Baden-Württemberg. The company consists of Scheppach GmbH and Woodster GmbH.

Products
 Bandsaws
 Cement mixers
 Chainsaws
 Garden electrical equipment
 Hedge cutters
 Table saws
 Log splitter
 scroll saws

See also
 Einhell and Stihl, also from Bavaria

References

External links
 Scheppach

1927 establishments in Germany
Chainsaws
Companies based in Bavaria
Construction equipment manufacturers of Germany
Garden tool manufacturers
German brands
Günzburg (district)
Manufacturing companies established in 1927
Power tool manufacturers
Tool manufacturing companies of Germany
Woodworking machines